The Shilahara/Shelara Kingdom (IAST: Śilāhāra; also Shelara, Selara, Shilara, Silara) was a royal dynasty that established itself in northern and southern Konkan in 8th century CE, present-day Mumbai and Southern Maharashtra (Kolhapur) during the Rashtrakuta period.

Shilahara Kingdom were split into three branches:
 First branch ruled North Konkan
 Second branch ruled South Konkan (between 765 and 1029 CE)
 Third branch ruled in modern districts of Kolhapur, Satara and Belagavi (between 940 and 1215 CE) after which they were overwhelmed by the Yadavas.

Origins
The dynasty originally began as vassals of the Rashtrakuta dynasty which ruled the Deccan plateau between the 8th and 10th centuries. Since then North Konkan came to be known as Kapardi-dvipa or Kavadidvipa. The capital of this branch was Puri, now known as Rajapur in the Raigad District.

The dynasty bore the title of Tagara-puradhishvara, which indicates that they originally hailed from Tagara (modern Ter in the Osmanabad District).

Around 1343 the island of Salsette, and eventually the whole archipelago, passed to the Muzaffarid dynasty.

Shilaharas of Southern Maharashtra at Kolhapur was the latest of the three and was founded about the time of downfall of the Rashtrakuta Empire.

All the branches of this family traced their descent from the legendary Vidyadhara prince Jimutavahana, who sacrificed himself to rescue a Naga prince from the clutches of Garuda. The family-name Shilahara (meaning "mountain-peak food" in Sanskrit) is supposed to have been derived from this incident. Even single inscriptions have more than one form of the name; one has the three forms Silara, Shilara and Shrillara.

North Konkan (Thane) branch (c. 800–1265 CE)

{
	"type": "FeatureCollection",
	"features": [
		{
			"type": "Feature",
			"properties": { "marker-symbol": "monument", "title": "Kanheri" },
			"geometry": { "type": "Point", "coordinates": [72.9069, 19.20585] }
		},
		{
			"type": "Feature",
			"properties": { "marker-symbol": "monument", "title": "Murud-Janjira" },
			"geometry": { "type": "Point", "coordinates": [72.9644, 18.29990] }
		},
		{
			"type": "Feature",
			"properties": { "marker-symbol": "monument", "title": "Bhare (Bhērē)" },
			"geometry": { "type": "Point", "coordinates": [73.1091, 19.39259] }
		},
		{
			"type": "Feature",
			"properties": { "marker-symbol": "monument", "title": "Ghodbunder Fort or Fort of Tanna (Ṭhāṇā)" },
			"geometry": { "type": "Point", "coordinates": [72.8883, 19.29611] }
		},
		{
			"type": "Feature",
			"properties": { "marker-symbol": "monument", "title": "Bhandup" },
			"geometry": { "type": "Point", "coordinates": [72.9306, 19.15001] }
		},
		{
			"type": "Feature",
			"properties": { "marker-symbol": "monument", "title": "Diveagar (Dīvē Āgar)" },
			"geometry": { "type": "Point", "coordinates": [72.9902, 18.16823] }
		},
		{
			"type": "Feature",
			"properties": { "marker-symbol": "monument", "title": "Chinchani near Dahanu" },
			"geometry": { "type": "Point", "coordinates": [72.6890, 19.88626] }
		},
		{
			"type": "Feature",
			"properties": { "marker-symbol": "monument", "title": "Thane" },
			"geometry": { "type": "Point", "coordinates": [72.9781, 19.21833] }
		},
		{
			"type": "Feature",
			"properties": { "marker-symbol": "monument", "title": "Ambarnath Temple" },
			"geometry": { "type": "Point", "coordinates": [73.1775, 19.19870] }
		},
		{
			"type": "Feature",
			"properties": { "marker-symbol": "monument", "title": "Kharepatan" },
			"geometry": { "type": "Point", "coordinates": [73.6257, 16.55691] }
		},
		{
			"type": "Feature",
			"properties": { "marker-symbol": "monument", "title": "Vadavali" },
			"geometry": { "type": "Point", "coordinates": [72.8320, 19.34174] }
		},
		{
			"type": "Feature",
			"properties": { "marker-symbol": "monument", "title": "Jogeshwari Caves" },
			"geometry": { "type": "Point", "coordinates": [72.8568, 19.13910] }
		},
		{
			"type": "Feature",
			"properties": { "marker-symbol": "monument", "title": "Chanje" },
			"geometry": { "type": "Point", "coordinates": [72.9505, 18.86351] }
		},
		{
			"type": "Feature",
			"properties": { "marker-symbol": "monument", "title": "Panhale" },
			"geometry": { "type": "Point", "coordinates": [73.5653, 16.82354] }
		},
		{
			"type": "Feature",
			"properties": { "marker-symbol": "monument", "title": "Nala Sopara" },
			"geometry": { "type": "Point", "coordinates": [72.8109, 19.41782] }
		},
		{
			"type": "Feature",
			"properties": { "marker-symbol": "monument", "title": "Agashi" },
			"geometry": { "type": "Point", "coordinates": [72.7747, 19.46039] }
		},
		{
			"type": "Feature",
			"properties": { "marker-symbol": "monument", "title": "Mahul" },
			"geometry": { "type": "Point", "coordinates": [72.8961, 19.01439] }
		},
		{
			"type": "Feature",
			"properties": { "marker-symbol": "monument", "title": "Chiplun" },
			"geometry": { "type": "Point", "coordinates": [73.5178, 17.53231] }
		},
		{
			"type": "Feature",
			"properties": { "marker-symbol": "monument", "title": "Vasai" },
			"geometry": { "type": "Point", "coordinates": [72.8397, 19.39193] }
		},
		{
			"type": "Feature",
			"properties": { "marker-symbol": "monument", "title": "Lonad" },
			"geometry": { "type": "Point", "coordinates": [73.1364, 19.29802] }
		},
		{
			"type": "Feature",
			"properties": { "marker-symbol": "monument", "title": "Parel (Māhavalī near Kurlā)" },
			"geometry": { "type": "Point", "coordinates": [72.8416, 19.00216] }
		},
		{
			"type": "Feature",
			"properties": { "marker-symbol": "monument", "title": "Vasai fort: Trivikrama temple" },
			"geometry": { "type": "Point", "coordinates": [72.8156, 19.33054] }
		},
		{
			"type": "Feature",
			"properties": { "marker-symbol": "monument", "title": "Mandvi (Mānḍavī)" },
			"geometry": { "type": "Point", "coordinates": [72.8973, 19.47660] }
		},
		{
			"type": "Feature",
			"properties": { "marker-symbol": "monument", "title": "Akshi" },
			"geometry": { "type": "Point", "coordinates": [72.8885, 18.62797] }
		},
		{
			"type": "Feature",
			"properties": { "marker-symbol": "monument", "title": "Agarwada (Āgar)" },
			"geometry": { "type": "Point", "coordinates": [73.0848, 18.14813] }
		},
		{
			"type": "Feature",
			"properties": { "marker-symbol": "monument", "title": "Ranwad (Rānvaḍ near Uraṇ)" },
			"geometry": { "type": "Point", "coordinates": [72.9180, 18.88057] }
		},
		{
			"type": "Feature",
			"properties": { "marker-symbol": "monument", "title": "Bhoighar" },
			"geometry": { "type": "Point", "coordinates": [72.9283, 18.46378] }
		}
	]
}

After Rashtrakuta power became weak, the last known ruler of this family, Rattaraja, declared his independence. But Chalukya Jayasimha, the younger brother of Vikramaditya, overthrew him and appropriated his possessions. North Konkan was conquered by the Rashtrakuta king Dantidurga sometime in the second quarter of the eighth century.

Rulers

 Kapardin I (800–825 CE)
 Pullashakti (825–850 CE)
 Kapardin II (850–880 CE)
 Vappuvanna (880–910 CE)
 Jhanjha (910–930 CE)
 Goggiraja (930–945 CE)
 Vajjada I (945–965 CE)
 Chhadvaideva (965–975 CE)
 Aparajita (975–1010 CE)
 Vajjada II (1010–1015 CE)
 Arikesarin (1015–1022 CE)
 Chhittaraja (1022–1035 CE)
 Nagarjuna (1035–1045 CE)
 Mummuniraja (1045–1070 CE)
 Ananta Deva I (1070–1127 CE)
 Aparaditya I (1127–1148 CE)
 Haripaladeva (1148–1155 CE)
 Mallikarjuna (1155–1170 CE)
 Aparaditya II ( 1170–1197 CE)
 Ananta Deva II (1198–1200 CE)
 Keshideva II (1200–1245 CE)
 Ananta Deva III (1245–1255 CE)
 Someshvara (1255–1265 CE)

South Konkan branch (c. 765–1020 CE)
{
	"type": "FeatureCollection",
	"features": [
		{
			"type": "Feature",
			"properties": { "marker-symbol": "monument", "title": "Kharepatan" },
			"geometry": { "type": "Point", "coordinates": [73.6257387, 16.5569086] }
		},
		{
			"type": "Feature",
			"properties": { "marker-symbol": "monument", "title": "Pattankudi (Paṭṭaṇakudi)" },
			"geometry": { "type": "Point", "coordinates": [74.4320448, 16.4026444] }
		}
	]
}
This house's history is known through one record, the Kharepatan plates of Rattaraja issued in 1008. Rattaraja was the last ruler of this dynasty. The document is extremely important as it not only gives the genealogy of the ten ancestors of Rattaraja but also mentions their exploits. The founder, Sanaphulla, was vassal of the Rastrakuta emperor Krisna I who had established his power over Konkan by 765 and probably handed it to Sanaphulla. The Kharepatan plates declare that Sanaphulla obtained lordship over the territory between Sahya mountain and the sea through the favour of Krisnaraja.

Sana-phulla's son Dhammayira is known to have built a fort at Vallipattana on the Western Coast. Aiyaparaja secured victory at Chandrapuri (Chandor) in Goa. The reign of Avasara I proved to be uneventful. His son Adityavarman, who is described as brilliant as the Sun in valour, offered help to the kings of Chandrapuri and Chemulya (modern Chaul), 30 miles to the south of Bombay, so the influence of the Shilaharas had spread over the whole of Konkan. At this time Laghu Kapardi, the ruler of the Thane branch, was just a boy and the help given to the ruler of Chaul must have been at his expense. Avasara II continued the policy of his father. Indraraja's son Bhima is styled as 'Rahuvadgrasta Chandramandala' because he overthrew the petty ruler of Chandor. At this time the Kadamba ruler Sasthadeva and his son Chaturbhuja were trying to overthrow the Rastrakuta rule. This explains Bhima's opposition to Chandrapuri or Chandor. Avasara III, no doubt, ruled in troubled times, but had no contribution of his to make. Finally, Rattaraja, loyal to the Rastrakutas, was compelled to transfer his allegiance to Taila II.

Soon after the issue of the plates in 1008, the rule of Konkan passed over to the later Chalukyas.  (Dept. Gazetteer: Kolaba, 1964, Dept. Gazetteer: 2002)

Rulers
 Sanaphulla (765–795 CE)
 Dhammayira (795–820 CE)
 Aiyaparaja (820–845 CE)
 Avasara I (845–870 CE)
 Adityavarma (870–895 CE)
 Avasara II (895–920 CE)
 Indraraja (920–945 CE)
 Bhima (945–970 CE)
 Avasara III (970–995 CE)
 Rattaraja (995–1020 CE)

Kolhapur branch (c. 940–1212 CE)
{
	"type": "FeatureCollection",
	"features": [
		{
			"type": "Feature",
			"properties": { "marker-symbol": "monument", "title": "Kolhapur - Mahalakshmi temple and Khāsbāg" },
			"geometry": { "type": "Point", "coordinates": [74.2229299, 16.6948253] }
		},
		{
			"type": "Feature",
			"properties": { "marker-symbol": "monument", "title": "Kasheli - Kanakaditya temple (Kaśēḷī)" },
			"geometry": { "type": "Point", "coordinates": [73.3190665, 16.7286767] }
		},
		{
			"type": "Feature",
			"properties": { "marker-symbol": "monument", "title": "Jugul (Jugal)" },
			"geometry": { "type": "Point", "coordinates": [74.6898085, 16.6225433] }
		},
		{
			"type": "Feature",
			"properties": { "marker-symbol": "monument", "title": "Shedbal" },
			"geometry": { "type": "Point", "coordinates": [74.7583657, 16.6909255] }
		},
		{
			"type": "Feature",
			"properties": { "marker-symbol": "monument", "title": "Miraj fort" },
			"geometry": { "type": "Point", "coordinates": [74.6532178, 16.819132] }
		},
		{
			"type": "Feature",
			"properties": { "marker-symbol": "monument", "title": "Vhannur - Jain temple (Honnur)" },
			"geometry": { "type": "Point", "coordinates": [74.2654079, 16.5850789] }
		},
		{
			"type": "Feature",
			"properties": { "marker-symbol": "monument", "title": "Herle" },
			"geometry": { "type": "Point", "coordinates": [74.3264869, 16.7496199] }
		},
		{
			"type": "Feature",
			"properties": { "marker-symbol": "monument", "title": "Tarale Khurd / Tarle Kasaba (Tāḷale)" },
			"geometry": { "type": "Point", "coordinates": [74.0153231, 16.4736359] }
		},
		{
			"type": "Feature",
			"properties": { "marker-symbol": "monument", "title": "Bamani" },
			"geometry": { "type": "Point", "coordinates": [74.2384748, 16.5366732] }
		}
	]
}
The Shilahara family at Kolhapur was the latest of the three and was founded about the time of the downfall of the Rashtrakuta Empire. They ruled over southern Maharashtra and Northern Karnataka, the modern districts of Satara, Kolhapur and Belagavi. Their family deity was the goddess Mahalakshmi, whose blessing they claimed to have secured in their copperplate grants (Mahalakshmi-labdha-vara-prasada). Like their relatives of the northern branch of Konkan, the Shilaharas of Kolhapur claimed to be of the lineage of the Vidyadhara Jimutavahana. They carried the banner of golden Garuda. One of the many titles used by the Shilaharas was Tagarapuravaradhisvara, or supreme sovereign ruler of Tagara.

The first capital of the Shilaharas was probably at Karad during the reign of Jatiga-II as known from their copper plate grant of Miraj and 'Vikramankadevacharita' of Bilhana. Hence sometimes they are referred as 'Shilaharas of Karad'. Later on although the capital was shifted to Kolhapur, some of their grants mention Valavada, and the hill fort of Pranalaka or Padmanala (Panhala) as the places of royal residence. Even though the capital was shifted to Kolhapur, Karhad retained its significance during the Shilahara period. This branch rose to power during the latter part of the Rashtrakuta rule and so, unlike the kings of the other two branches, those of this branch do not mention the genealogy of the Rashtrakutas even in their early grants. Later on they acknowledged the suzerainty of the later Chalukya for some time. This branch continued to hold the Southern Maharashtra from circa 940 to 1220.

It seems that Bhoja II, the last ruler of this family, was overthrown and dispossessed by Singhana in or soon after 1219-20 (Saka 1131) as is borne out by one of Singhana's inscriptions dated Saka 1160.

Rulers
 Jatiga I (940–960 CE)
 Naivarman (960–980 CE)
 Chandra (980–1000 CE)
 Jatiga II (1000–1020 CE)
 Gonka (1020–1050 CE)
 Guhala I (1050 CE)
 Kirtiraja (1050 CE)
 Chandraditya (1050 CE)
 Marsimha (1050–1075 CE)
 Guhala II (1075–1085 CE)
 Bhoja I (1085–1100 CE)
 Ballala (1100–1108 CE)
 Gonka II (1108 CE)
 Gandaraditya I (1108–1138 CE)
 Vijayaditya I (1138–1175 CE)
 Bhoja II (1175–1212 CE), last ruler of dynasty

Monuments
A number of ancient monuments in Mumbai and Kolhapur district pay tribute to this dynasty's prowess:
 The Walkeshwar Temple and the Banganga Tank were built during the reign of Chittaraja, a king of this dynasty.
 The Shiv Mandir, Ambarnath, also near Mumbai, was also built by Chittaraja in 1030
 Kopineshwar Mandir, a Shiva temple in Thane.
 Roopanarayan Jain temple of 4 different tirthankar consisting 2 Old Kannada stone inscriptions of king Bhoja and King Gandaraditya. (10 C.AD) -Mahadwar road, kolhapur .
 Parshwanath Jain temple of Kolhapur Shilaharas at Ibrahimpur and Bhogoli in Chandgad taluka.
 Parshwanath Jain temple of Kolhapur Shilaharas at Ainapur in Gadhinglaj taluka.
 Parshwanath Jain temple of Kolhapur Shilaharas at Baamni and Sangaon in Kagal taluka.
  Idol of Parshwanath Jain tirthankar found in excavation of Hupari in Hatkanangale taluka has Kannada inscriptions Kolhapur Shilaharas.
 11th century A.D. 1st tirthankar Rishabhnath Jain temple at Pattankodoli in Hatkanangale taluka of Kolhapur Shilaharas has Kannada inscription stating the reign of king Gandaraditya.
 Chandraprabhu 8th Jain tirthankar temple at Herle near Kolhapur with Kannada inscriptions of Shilaharas.
 22nd Jain tirthnakar Neminath temple at Khidrapur of king Gandaraditya era of Kolhapur shilaharas.

See also
 Konkan
 History of India
 History of Maharashtra
 History of Karnataka

References

Bibliography 
 
 
 
 .  Written for The Bombay Gazetteer.

External links
 Silver Coin of Shilaharas of Southern Maharashtra (Coinex 2006 - Souvenir)

History of Mumbai
Dynasties of India
Hindu dynasties
Shilahara dynasty